Live On is a South Korean television series starring Jung Da-bin, Hwang Min-hyun, Noh Jong-hyun, Yang Hye-ji, Yeonwoo and Choi Byung-chan. Written by Bang Yoo-jung and directed by Kim Sang-woo, the series centers on a high school girl who joins her school's broadcasting club in order to catch the person trying to reveal her secret. It aired on JTBC from November 17, 2020 to January 12, 2021.

Synopsis
A story of love and friendship unfolds in a school where social media is a defining force and everybody is judged according to one's looks, sense of fashion and popularity.

Baek Ho-rang (Jung Da-bin), a high school student, is popular on social media for being pretty and classy, but her standoffish and cold behaviour in person earns her a considerable number of haters. One day, a strange message from an anonymous sender is read over the school radio. The message reminds Ho-rang of a traumatic episode from her past. An anonymous account has also been threatening to blackmail her by exposing her secret. Due to this, Ho-rang decides to join the broadcasting club, led by the perfectionist and overly time-conscious Go Eun-taek (Hwang Min-hyun), in order to track down the person attempting to defame her behind a keyboard.

Cast

Main
 Jung Da-bin as Baek Ho-rang
 a student of Class 2-1 in Seoyeon High School and an anchorwoman of SHBS. Ho-rang is a social media influencer renowned for being pretty and classy, albeit her being standoffish and cold in person earns her also a considerable number of haters. She joins Seoyeon's broadcasting club SHBS with an ulterior motive: to find out the person who is trying to divulge her long-hidden secret which is linked to a traumatic episode in her past.
 Hwang Min-hyun as Ko Eun-taek
 a student of Class 2-3 in Seoyeon High School and the manager of Seoyeon's broadcasting club SHBS. Eun-taek lives a life that follows an exact, stringent timetable. He is known by his clubmates for being a strict, perfectionist and overly time-conscious leader who does not put even a mere second to waste.
 Noh Jong-hyun as Do Woo-jae
 a student of Class 2-3 in Seoyeon High School and member of the student council; Eun-taek's friend and Jae-yi's boyfriend. Woo-jae is a person who is often quiet and acts rationally in any situation, complementing Eun-taek's perfectionist personality. He sports a dull face which brightens only when he sees Jae-yi.
 Yang Hye-ji as Ji So-hyun
 a student of Class 2-3 in Seoyeon High School and deputy manager of SHBS; Ho-rang's former best friend. A model student with high grades, So-hyun was once more comfortable hanging out with boys until she became best friends with Ho-rang back in middle school. Her friendship with Ho-rang was severed due to misunderstandings and a tragic incident that happened to Ho-rang.
 Yeonwoo as Kang Jae-yi
 a student of Class 2-1 in Seoyeon High School; Woo-jae's girlfriend. Jae-yi is a pretty girl with an outspoken and simple-minded personality in contrast to that of Woo-jae. She is concerned with Woo-jae being hesitant to open up his thoughts to her.
 Choi Byung-chan as Kim Yoo-shin
 a student of Class 2-1 in Seoyeon High School; Ho-rang's friend. In contrast to Ho-rang, Yoo-shin is a bubbly and easygoing person with an appearance of innocence and a bit of ingenuity. He likes So-hyun very much.

Supporting

SHBS Broadcasting Club
 Lee Se-hee as Jung Hee-soo
 a Class 2 student and member of the SHBS; the person revealed in later episodes to be the Internet troll attempting to reveal Ho-rang's tragic past to the public. Hee-soo is one of Ho-rang's schoolmates back in middle school who hates Ho-rang very much.
 Hyun Woo-seok as Kwon Sung-joon
 a junior student and a member of the SHBS. Sung-joon joined SHBS because he thinks the club and its leader Eun-taek looks cool.
 Woo Da-bi as Kim Eun-ha
 a junior student and a member of the SHBS. Eun-ha aspires to become a great senior like So-hyun.
 Yang Jung-yeon as Kim Hee-won
 a junior student and a member of the SHBS. Hee-won is baffled by how working in SHBS is harder than what she thought.
 Jo Joon-young as Park Young-jae
 a junior student and a member of the SHBS. Young-jae considers SHBS the best among the clubs in school and enjoys the life of radio broadcasting.
 Kim Eun-soo as Shin Jin-gook
 a Class 2 student and member of the SHBS.

Other students
 Wooyeon as Do Woo-sol
 Woo-jae's younger sister. Woo-sol acts like a love counselor between Woo-jae and Jae-yi.
 Shin Yun-seop as Jung-bin
 Choi Su-jin as Soo-jin
 Kang Hae-lim as Park Hye-rim
 Jung Soo-bin as Lee Sun-Joo, a girl from Ho-Rang’s earlier life who beat her up in a key earlier incident that Ho-rang tries to hide

Special appearances

 Lee Han-wi as school headmaster (Ep. 1-2)
 Ahn Se-ha as literature teacher (Ep. 1)
 Kim Hye-yoon as Seo Hyun-ah (Ep. 1)
 Go Woo-ri as music teacher (Ep. 1)
 Jung Soo-young as Jae-yi's mother (Ep. 2)
 Cha Yeob as sports teacher (Ep. 2)
 Jeon No-min as Eun-taek's father (Ep. 3)
 Yoon Yoo-sun as Ho-rang's mother (Ep. 3, 5, 7 & 8)
 Kim Jung-hak as Ho-rang's father (Ep. 3 & 5)
 Song Seon-mi as Eun-taek's mother (Ep. 4 & 7)
 Kenta as actor in the film (Ep. 4)
 Lena as actress in the film (Ep. 4)
 Yeonjun as Kim Jin-woo, So-hyun’s ex-boyfriend (Ep. 8)

Episodes

Production
The first script reading took place on August 5, 2020.

Original soundtrack

Album

Singles

Part 1

Part 2

Part 3

Part 4

Ratings

International broadcast
The series will be available with multi-languages subtitles on iQIYI in South East Asia and Taiwan.
The series will also be available on Viki with multi-languages subtitles.

In other media
Bang Yoo-jung's screenplays for all episodes of Live On were published as one set on January 28, 2021 by Wisdom House. The screenplays are available for purchase both in print and e-book formats.

Notes

References

External links
  
 
 
 

JTBC television dramas
Korean-language television shows
2020 South Korean television series debuts
2021 South Korean television series endings
South Korean high school television series
South Korean teen dramas
Television series about teenagers
Television series about social media
Television series by KeyEast
Television series by JTBC Studios
Television productions suspended due to the COVID-19 pandemic
Playlist Studio original programming